Alertness is the state of active attention by high sensory awareness such as being watchful and prompt to meet danger or emergency, or being quick to perceive and act. It is related to psychology as well as to physiology. A lack of alertness is a symptom of a number of conditions, including narcolepsy, attention deficit disorder, chronic fatigue syndrome, depression, Addison's disease, or sleep deprivation. Pronounced lack of alertness can be graded as an altered level of consciousness. States with low levels of alertness include drowsiness.

The word is formed from "alert", which comes from the Italian "all'erta" (on the watch, literally, on the height; 1618).

Wakefulness refers mainly to differences between the sleep and the wake state, including for modulation or stimulation of these pathways, and vigilance refers to sustained alertness and concentration but both terms are sometimes used synonymously with alertness.

Physiological aspects

People who have to be alert during their jobs, such as air traffic controllers or pilots, often face challenges maintaining their alertness. Research shows that for people "...engaged in attention-intensive and monotonous tasks, retaining a constant level of alertness is rare if not impossible." If people employed in safety-related or transportation jobs have lapses in alertness, this "may lead to severe consequences in occupations ranging from air traffic control to monitoring of nuclear power plants."

Biological pathways

Neurotransmitters that can initiate, promote, or enhance wakefulness or alertness are serotonin, (nor)epinephrine, dopamine (e.g. blockade of dopamine reuptake), glutamate, histamine and acetylcholine. Neuromodulators that can do so include neuropeptide orexin. Similarly inhibition or reduction of alertness-inhibiting mechanisms such as certain cytokines and adenosine (as with caffeine) may also increase alertness. Wakefulness depends on the coordinated effort of multiple brain areas. These are affected by neurotransmitters and other factors. Activating some specific neuronal populations was also found to increase wakefulness. Experiments indicate that none of these neurotransmitters or the neurons producing them are individually necessary for maintaining wakefulness. Research to map the wakefulness circuitry is ongoing.

Beta power has been used as an indicator of cortical arousal or alertness by several studies. A study also measured alertness with EEG data.

Drugs used to increase alertness
Around the world, the stimulant adenosine receptor antagonist caffeine is widely used to increase alertness or wakefulness and improve mood or performance, typically in the form of drinks like green tea (where it is mixed with bioactive l-theanine), energy drinks (also containing high amounts of sugar/sugar-substitutes), or coffee (like teas also containing various bioactive polyphenols). It is at least one of the world's most consumed drugs.

Various natural biochemicals and herbs are investigated for similar or antifatigue effects, as well as other potentially negative as well as positive effects, such as rhodiola rosea. Various psychostimulants like bromantane are also investigated as a potential treatment (or complementary component of such) of numerous neurological disorders. Alkaloids theacrine and methylliberine (Dynamine) are structurally similar to caffeine and are less commonly also used as energizers (e.g. both in combination with liberine), and, like l-theanine, may potentiate and synergize with caffeine in ways some may consider beneficial.

During the Second World War, US soldiers and aviators were given benzedrine, an amphetamine drug, to increase their alertness during long periods on duty. While air force pilots are able to use the drug to remain awake during combat flights, the use of amphetamines by commercial airline pilots is forbidden. British troops used 72 million amphetamine tablets in the second world war and the RAF used so many that "Methedrine won the Battle of Britain" according to one report. American bomber pilots use amphetamines ("go pills") to stay awake during long missions. The Tarnak Farm incident, in which an American F-16 pilot killed several friendly Canadian soldiers on the ground, was blamed by the pilot on his use of amphetamine. A nonjudicial hearing rejected the pilot's claim.
Amphetamines are used by college and high-school students as a study and test-taking aid. Amphetamine increases energy levels, concentration, and motivation, allowing students to study for an extended period of time. These drugs are often acquired through ADHD prescriptions to students and peers, rather than illicitly produced drugs. Cocaine is also used to increase alertness, as is coca in the form of coca tea.

The eugeroic modafinil has recently gained popularity with the US Military and other militaries. It increases alertness but, having a long half-life, delays or impairs sleep-onset, with there being no marketed shorter-acting version.

Other approaches for increasing alertness
Beyond good sleep, physical activity and healthy diet, a review suggests uses of odours, music and extrinsic motivation may have the potential to increase alertness or decrease mental fatigue. Short rest periods and selected lighting (level and type of) may also be useful. Various types of neurostimulation are being researched, as is the microbiome and related interventions.

Alertness after waking
A study suggests non-genetic determinants of alertness after waking up from sleep are:
 sleep quantity/quality the night before
 physical activity the day prior
 a breakfast rich in carbohydrate
 a lower blood glucose response following breakfast
(modifiable as well, for example via choice of food and with berberine)

The baseline of daily alertness is related to the quality of their sleep (currently measured only by self-reported quality), positive emotional state (specifically self-report happiness), and age. There are genes that enable people to be apparently healthy and alert with little sleep. Nevertheless, twin-pair analyses indicated that the genetic contribution in daytime alertness is quantifiably small overall. Other factors such as the natural light exposure and synchronicity with the circadian rhythm may matter as well.

Behavioral ecology
Vigilance is an important trait for animals in order to watch out for predators. Typically a reduction in alertness is observed for animals that live in larger groups. Studies on vigilance have been conducted on various animals including the scaly-breasted munia.

See also
Awareness
Consciousness
Disorders of consciousness
Wakefulness

References

Attention
Cognitive neuroscience
Mental states